Mr. Bond is a 1992 Indian Hindi action film directed by Raj Sippy released on 16 April 1992. It stars Akshay Kumar, Sheeba, Ruchika Pandey, Vaishali Sood, a daughter of an Indian Navy Officer making her debut and Pankaj Dheer, and was written by Iqbal Durrani.

Plot 
Mr. Bond is a dedicated police officer of Bombay's police. He was assigned to a mission to save the children victims of child trafficking. Those small children were abducted and held as hostages by the underworld don Dragon.

Cast
 Akshay Kumar as Bond
 Sheeba as Sunita
 Ruchika Pandey as Neelam
 Pankaj Dheer as Dragon / Daga
 Mac Mohan
 Dolly Minhas
Vaishali Sood

Soundtrack

References

External links 

 

1992 films
1990s Hindi-language films
Films scored by Anand–Milind
Indian action thriller films
Films directed by Raj N. Sippy
1992 action thriller films
Parody films based on James Bond films